Kaler may refer to:

Places
Kaler, Armenia, a town in Syunik Province, Armenia
Kaler, Kentucky, an unincorporated community in Graves County, Kentucky, United States
Kaler, Bihar, a block in Arwal district, Bihar, India

People with the surname
Berwick Kaler (born 1947), British actor
Eric Kaler (born 1956), American university president
Ilya Kaler (born 1963), Russian violinist
James Otis Kaler (1848–1912), American journalist
Jamie Kaler (born 1964), American comedian
James B. Kaler (born 1934), American astronomer and author
Kanth Kaler (born 1972), India singer